Movement in learning or movement-based instruction is a teaching method based on the concept that humans learn better through movement. This teaching method can be applied to students, who should have the opportunity throughout a class period to move around to take "brain breaks" to refocus their attention so they can learn new material. Brain research suggests that physical activity prior to class (in PE for example) and during class, increases students' ability to process and retain new material. This is a new and controversial development in education, and, to date, has little research and empirical data to support this trend.  However, anecdotal evidence regarding the benefits of incorporating movement in the classroom is promising.

Benefits 
Physical movement stimulates long-term memory and recall  because it has been associated in the human brain with survival and this is supported by brain imaging studies. This is confirmed by findings such as the studies that show exercise shapes muscles along with the strengthening of some areas of the brain, growing brain cells and increases alertness in the process. It is said that the harder the task is for students, the greater the cerebellar activity.  Specifically, short movement breaks for the brain is said to lead to more opportunities for information processing and increased memory formation. It contributes to the overall cognitive development of the students because it sends oxygen, water, and glucose to the brain, helping it grow and improve mood and motivation. In addition, the area of the brain that processes movement is also the part that processes cognitive tasks. The link between movement and the cognitive development has been proven as early as the 1960s during Richard Held and Alan Hein's experiments that revealed the role of physical activity on the development of brain networks that are important for adaptive mental function.

Students through brain breaks to engage in physical activities can facilitate physical development. In combination with the socialization, which also contributes to the learners' socio-emotional development - movements offer a quick and convenient way to support the rapid development, especially among young learners. This can be demonstrated in the efficacy of using physical tasks to address the needs of hyperactive students because they release stress and energy, allowing them to focus on their studies without causing disruption in the class. Movements also eliminate lethargy that results from sitting for long periods of time. There are recorded cases, for instance, that show marked improvement in school performance for learners who were made to do physical tasks such as walking in mid-afternoon.

Applications in the classroom
Ideally students should be getting physical activity before they try to learn new material.  However, if it is not possible for students to have physical activity before a lecture, there are many ways to get students out of their seats and moving during a class period. Students can get out of their seats to turn an assignment in or to pick up a handout. You could have students stand up to share their answers to questions posed by the teacher. After they have shared their answers with each other they may sit down. If students are acting tired and drowsy a teacher could give students a quick break to stand up and stretch. Once they get out of their seats and move around for a bit they will act more alert. Students that struggle to stay focused or are seen as disruptive can benefit greatly from movement in the classroom.

Younger students can benefit from a variety of activities that get them moving and also reinforce what they are learning. Brain based learning supports the use of movement in learning. According to the University of Wisconsin at Stevens Point, a core principal of brain-based learning states, "Learning engages the whole body. All learning is mind-body: movement, foods, attention cycles, and chemicals modulate learning." Another core principal states, "Complex learning is enhanced by challenge and inhibited by stress. Another state,"Enrichment: The brain can grow new connections at any age. Challenging, complex experiences with appropriate feedback are best. Cognitive skills develop better with music and motor skills. (Dï Arcangelo)" The U.S. National Institute of Health as well as the Mayo Clinic list exercise and movement as a way to decrease stress levels. Elementary aged children can only absorb 15 to 20 minutes worth of material at a time. Taking brain breaks is a win-win situation. Students can learn during these brain breaks plus return to a task renewed and energized.

Also try Drums Alive Academic Beats for ideas that will help in science, and math lessons.

Simple movements can have the ability to improve cognition in just seconds (Krock & Hartung, 1992) 
Chart: Sample movements and classroom applications

Additional benefits for special-needs learners
Many special-needs learners are stuck in counterproductive mental states, and movement is a quick way to change them, movements, such as those involved in playing active games, will activate the brain across a wide variety of areas. A study by Reynolds and colleagues (2003) found that children with dyslexia were helped by a movement program. Those in the intervention group showed significantly greater improvement in dexterity, reading, verbal fluency, and semantic fluency than did the control group. The exercising group also made substantial gains on national standardized tests of reading, writing, and comprehension in comparison with students in the previous year.

See also
Psychomotor learning

References

Further reading
Brain Breaks - Original for elementary classrooms from the Michigan Dept. of Education
Brain Breaks - 2005 for elementary classrooms from the Michigan Dept. of Education
Take 10! from the International Life Sciences Institute Research Foundation
Dr. John Ratey Harvard Brain Researcher
Naperville Central High School- Movement and Learning Website
WikEd page of Movement in Learning
Pumping Up The Brain, CBS News February 4, 2009
Moran, C. (2008, March 11). Runners add a dash of fitness to school day. The San Diego Union-Tribune. Retrieved March 26, 2008, from 
Courchesne, E., & Allen, G. (1997). Prediction and preparation, fundamental functions of the cerebellum. Learning and Memory, 4, 1–35.
Chaouloff, F. (1989). Physical exercise and brain monoamines: A review. Acta Physiologica Scandinavica, 137, 1–13.
Desmond, J., Gabrielli, J., Wagner, A., Ginier, B., & Glover, G. (1997). Lobular patterns of cerebellar activation in verbal working-memory and finger tapping tasks as revealed by functional MRI. Journal of Neuroscience, 17(24), 9675–9685.
Flanagan, J. R., Vetter, P., Johansson, R. S., & Wolpert, D. M. (2003). Prediction preceded control in motor learning. Current Biology, 13, 146–150 
Fordyce, D. E., & Wehner, J. M. (1993). Physical activity enhances spatial learning performance with an associated alteration in hippocampal protein kinase C activity in C57BL/6 and DBA/2 mice. Brain Research, 619(1–2), 111–119.
Greenough, W. T., & Anderson, B. J. (1991). Cerebellar synaptic plasticity: Relation to learning versus neutral activity. Annals of the New York Academy of Science, 627: 231-247
Ivry, R. (1997). Cerebellar timing systems. International Review of Neurobiology, 41, 555–573.
Jensen, E.  (2000). Moving with the brain in mind. Education leadership, 58(3): 34-37
Jensen, E.  (2005). Teaching with the brain in mind (Revised 2nd ed.)Chapter 4: Movement and Learning. Alexandria, VA: Association for Supervision and Curriculum Development. Retrieved from http://www.ascd.org/publications/books/104013/chapters/Movement-and-Learning.aspx
Kempermann, G. (2002). Why new neurons? Possible functions for adult hippocampal neurogenesis. Journal of Neuroscience, 22(3), 635–638.
Kesslak, J., Patrick, V., So, J., Cotman, C., & Gomez-Pinilla, F. (1998). Learning upregulates brain-derived neurotrophic factor messenger ribonucleic acid: A mechanism to facilitate encoding and circuit maintenance. Behavioral Neuroscience, 112(4), 1012–1019.
Krock, L. P., & Hartung, G. H. (1992). Influence of post-exercise activity on plasma catecholamines, blood pressure and heart rate in normal subjects. Clinical Autonomic Research, 2(2), 89–97.
Schmahmann, J. D. (1997). The cerebellum and cognition, 1st edition. International Review of Neurobiology,  
Middleton, F., & Strick, P. (1994). Anatomical evidence for cerebellar an basal ganglia involvement in higher brain functions. Journal of Science 226(5184): 458-461
Reynolds, D., Nicolson, R. I., & Hambly, H. (2003). Evaluation of an exercise-based treatment for children with reading difficulties. Dyslexia, 9(1), 48–71.
Saklofske, D., & Kelly, I. (1992). The effects of exercise and relaxation on energetic and tense arousal. Personality and Individual Differences, 13, 623–625
Tong, L., Shen, H., Perreau, V. M., Balazs, R., & Cotman, C. W. (2001). Effects of exercise on geneexpression profile in the rat hippocampus. Neurobiology of Disease, 8(6), 1046–1056.

External links
An example of how this theory can be utilized
Moving to Improve
The Benefits of Movement in the Classroom
Movement in Learning: Revitalizing the Classroom
Movement and Learning: What's the Connection?
This article is based on an earlier version originally posted at WikEd and reposted here by the author.

Teaching